The Anglo-American Loan Agreement was a loan made to the United Kingdom by the United States on 15 July 1946, enabling its economy after the Second World War to keep afloat. The loan was negotiated by British economist John Maynard Keynes and American diplomat William L. Clayton. Problems arose on the American side, with many in Congress reluctant, and with sharp differences between the treasury and state departments. The loan was for $3.75 billion at a low 2% interest rate; Canada loaned an additional US$1.19 billion. The British economy in 1947 was hurt by a provision that called for convertibility into dollars of the wartime sterling balances the British had borrowed from India and others, but by 1948, the Marshall Plan included financial support that was not expected to be repaid. The entire loan was paid off in 2006, after it was extended six years.

Background

At the start of the war, Britain had spent the money that they did have in normal payments for materiel under the "US cash-and-carry" scheme. Basing rights were also traded for equipment, e.g., the Destroyers for Bases Agreement, but by 1941 Britain was no longer able to finance cash payments and Lend-Lease was introduced. Lend Lease aid did not have to be paid back, but the other loans did.

Large quantities of goods were in Britain or in transit when Washington suddenly and unexpectedly terminated Lend-Lease on 21 August 1945. The British economy had been heavily geared towards war production (constituting 55% of GDP in 1944) and had drastically reduced its exports. The UK therefore relied on Lend-Lease imports to obtain essential consumer commodities such as food while it could no longer afford to pay for these items using export profits. The end of Lend-Lease thus came as a great economic shock. Britain needed to retain some of this equipment in the immediate post war period. As a result, the Anglo-American loan came about. Lend-lease items retained were sold to Britain at the knockdown price of about 10 cents on the dollar, giving an initial value of £1.075 billion.

Agreement

Terms
John Maynard Keynes, then in poor health and shortly before his death, was sent by the United Kingdom to the United States and Canada to obtain more funds. British politicians expected that in view of the United Kingdom's contribution to the war effort, especially for the lives lost before the United States entered the fight in 1941, America would offer favourable terms. Instead of a grant or a gift, however, Keynes was offered a loan on favourable terms.

Historian Alan Sked has commented that, "the U.S. didn't seem to realize that Britain was bankrupt", and that the loan was "denounced in the House of Lords, but in the end the country had no choice." America offered $US3.75bn (worth US$ billion in ) and Canada contributed another US$1.19 bn (worth US$ billion in ), both at the rate of 2% annual interest. The total amount repaid, including interest, was $7.5bn (£3.8bn) to the US and US$2bn (£1bn) to Canada.

The loan was made subject to conditions, the most damaging of which was the convertibility of sterling. Though not the intention, the effect of convertibility was to worsen British post-war economic problems. International sterling balances became convertible one year after the loan was ratified, on 15 July 1947. Within a month, nations with sterling balances (e.g. pounds which they had earned from buying British exports, and which they were now permitted to sell to Britain in exchange for dollars) had drawn almost a billion dollars from British dollar reserves, forcing the British government to suspend convertibility and to begin immediate drastic cuts in domestic and overseas expenditure. The rapid loss of dollar reserves also highlighted the weakness of sterling, which was devalued in 1949 from $4.02 to $2.80.

In later years, the term of 2% interest was rather less than the prevailing market interest rates, resulting in it being described as a "very advantageous loan" by members of the British government, as elaborated below.

Loan spending 
Much of the loan had been earmarked for foreign military spending to maintain the United Kingdom's empire and payments to British allies prior to its passage, which had been concealed in negotiations through to the summer of 1946. Keynes had noted that a failure to pass the loan agreement would cause Britain to abandon its military outposts in the Middle Eastern, Asian and Mediterranean regions, as the alternative of reducing British standards of living was politically unfeasible.

Repayment
The last payment was made on 29 December 2006 for the sum of about $83m USD (£45.5m) to the United States, and about $23.6m USD (£12m) to Canada; the 29th was chosen as it was the last working day of the year. The final payment was actually six years late, the British Government having suspended payments due in the years 1956, 1957, 1964, 1965, 1968 and 1976 because the exchange rates were seen as impractical. After this final payment Britain's Economic Secretary to the Treasury, Ed Balls, formally thanked the US for its wartime support.

In television
Sir Christopher Meyer presented a history of the loan and its effects in the BBC series Mortgaged to the Yanks.

See also
 Postwar Britain (1945–1979)

References

Sources
 
 Callaway, C. Darden. The Anglo-American Loan of 1946: U.S. Economic Opportunism and the Start of the Cold War (2014)  Excerpt
  
 
 Gardner, Richard N. Sterling-Dollar Diplomacy in Current Perspective: The Origins and the Prospects of Our International Economic Order (1980)
 Grant Jr., Philip A. "President Harry S. Truman and the British Loan Act of 1946," Presidential Studies Quarterly, (Summer 1995) 25#3 pp 489–496
  
 
 Skidelsky, Robert. John Maynard Keynes. Vol. 3: Fighting for Freedom, 1937–1946 (2001) pp. 403–58
 
 Wevill, Richard. Britain and America after World War II: Bilateral Relations and the Beginnings of the Cold War (I.B. Tauris, 2012)
 The Collected Writings of John Maynard Keynes, Volumes 24 (London: Macmillan Press, 1979)

External links
  Oral History Interview with John W. Snyder

Economic history of the United Kingdom
Economic history of the United States
Aftermath of World War II in the United Kingdom
United Kingdom–United States relations
1946 in the United States
Economic aid during World War II
Presidency of Franklin D. Roosevelt
United States federal commerce legislation
United States foreign relations legislation
1946 in international relations
Aftermath of World War II in the United States
Presidency of Harry S. Truman
1946 in economics
Loans
1946 in the United Kingdom